The 1982 Atlantic hurricane season was an event in the annual tropical cyclone season in the north Atlantic Ocean. It was an inactive Atlantic hurricane season, during which only five tropical cyclones formed. The season officially began on June 1, 1982 and ended November 30, 1982. These dates, adopted by convention, historically describe the period in each year when most systems form. this year, however, most tropical activity was constrained to the month of September.

This season produced eight tropical depressions, of which five became named storms; two attained hurricane status, of which one became a major hurricane, a storm that ranks as a Category 3 or higher on the Saffir–Simpson scale. Hurricane Alberto, the season's first named storm, was one of four storms on record to attain hurricane status in the Gulf of Mexico that not make landfall. The other three were Laurie of 1969, Henri of 1979, and Jeanne of 1980. Nonetheless, rains from Alberto caused severe flooding, which killed 23 people in Cuba. The season's only major hurricane, Debby, reached peak intensity as a weak Category 4 over the open waters of the Atlantic. Tropical Storm Ernesto, the last storm of the season, peaked in intensity on October 2 just below hurricane strength. It then dissipated the next day, 58 days before the official end of the season.

This timeline documents tropical cyclone formations, strengthening, weakening, landfalls, extratropical transitions, and dissipations during the season. It includes information that was not released throughout the season, meaning that data from post-storm reviews by the National Hurricane Center, such as a storm that was not initially warned upon, has been included.

By convention, meteorologists one time zone when issuing forecasts and making observations: Coordinated Universal Time (UTC), and also use the 24-hour clock (where 00:00 = midnight UTC). In this time line, all information is listed by UTC first with the respective local time included in parentheses.

Timeline

June
June 1

The Atlantic hurricane season officially begins.

June 2
2 p.m. EDT (1800 UTC) – Tropical Depression One forms 75 miles (120 km) north-northeast of Cancún, Mexico.

June 3
2 a.m. EDT (0600 UTC) – Tropical Depression One strengthens into Tropical Storm Alberto.
2 p.m. EDT (1800 UTC) - Tropical Storm Alberto strengthens into a hurricane.

June 4
2 a.m. EDT (0600 UTC) - Hurricane Alberto weakens into a tropical storm.
8 p.m. EDT (0000 UTC June 5) - Tropical Storm Alberto weakens into a tropical depression.

June 6
8 a.m. EDT (1200 UTC) - Tropical Depression Alberto degenerates into a tropical disturbance shortly before dissipating.

June 17
8 p.m. EDT (0000 UTC June 18) - Subtropical Depression One forms 280 miles (450 km) west-southwest of Cape Coral, Florida.

June 18
8 a.m.

June 19
8 a.m.

June 20
2 p.m. EDT (1800 UTC) - Subtropical Storm One transitions into an extratropical cyclone just south of Newfoundland.

July
No tropical cyclones formed during the month of July.

August
August 28

8 a.m. AST (1200 UTC) - Tropical Depression Two forms 120 miles (195 km) southeast of Praia, Cape Verde.
2 p.m. AST (1800 UTC) - Tropical Depression Two strengthens into Tropical Storm Beryl.

August 29
2 a.m.

September
September 2
2 p.m. AST (1800 UTC) - Tropical Storm Beryl weakens to a tropical depression.

September 5
8 p.m. AST (0000 UTC September 6) - Tropical Depression Three forms 560 miles (900 km) east of Guadeloupe.

September 6
2 p.m. AST (1800 UTC) - Tropical Depression Beryl dissipates over open waters.

September 8

7 p.m. CDT (0000 UTC September 9) - Subtropical Depression Two forms 265 miles (425 km) south-southeast of New Orleans, Louisiana.

September 9
8 a.m. AST (1200 UTC) - Tropical Depression Three dissipates over open waters.
7 p.m. CDT (0000 UTC September 10) - Subtropical Depression Two transitions into a tropical cyclone, but is not given a number.

September 10
7 a.m. CDT (1200 UTC) - The Unnumbered Tropical Depression strengthens into Tropical Storm Chris.

September 11
7 a.m.
7 p.m. CDT (0000 UTC September 12) - Tropical Storm Chris weakens to a tropical depression.

September 12
7 p.m. CDT (0000 UTC September 13) - Tropical Depression Chris dissipates over Arkansas.

September 13
8 a.m. AST (1200 UTC) - Tropical Depression Five forms 95 miles (150 km) north-northeast of Santo Domingo, Dominican Republic.

September 14
8 a.m. AST (1200 UTC) - Tropical Depression Five strengthens into Tropical Storm Debby.
8 p.m. AST (0000 UTC September 15) - Tropical Storm Debby strengthens into a hurricane.

September 15
2 p.m. AST (1800 UTC) - Hurricane Debby strengthens into a Category 2 hurricane.

September 16
exact time unknown - Tropical Depression Six forms 900 miles (1,400 km) west of the Cape Verde Islands.

September 17

2 p.m.
8 p.m. AST (0000 UTC September 18) - Hurricane Debby strengthens into a Category 4 hurricane.

September 18
2 a.m. AST (0600 UTC) - Hurricane Debby weakens to a Category 3 hurricane.
8 p.m.

September 19
2 a.m. AST (0600 UTC) - Hurricane Debby weakens to a Category 1 hurricane.

September 20
2 a.m. AST (0600 UTC) - Hurricane Debby weakens to a tropical storm.
2 p.m. AST (1800 UTC) - Tropical Storm Debby transitions into an extratropical cyclone over open waters.
exact time unknown - Tropical Depression Six dissipates 750 miles (1,210 km) east of the Leeward Islands.

September 23
8 p.m. AST (0000 UTC September 24) - Tropical Depression Seven forms 365 miles (590 km) west of Nassau, Bahamas.

September 27

8 a.m. AST (1200 UTC) - Tropical Depression Seven dissipates over open waters.

September 30
8 a.m. AST (1200 UTC) - Tropical Depression Eight forms 445 miles (720 km) northeast of the Turks and Caicos Islands.

October
October 1

2 a.m. AST (0600 UTC) - Tropical Depression Eight strengthens into Tropical Storm Ernesto.

October 2
8 p.m. AST (0000 UTC October 3) - Tropical Storm Ernesto transitions into an extratropical cyclone.

November
November 30
The Atlantic hurricane season officially ends.

See also

Lists of Atlantic hurricanes

Notes

References

External links
 nhc.noaa.gov, National Hurricane Center homepage

1982 Atlantic hurricane season
1982 meteorology
1982 Atlantic hurricane season
1982 ATL T